Luiz Carlos da Silva (born 23 January 1969) is a Brazilian former athlete who specialised in the marathon.

Born in Floraí, Paraná, da Silva is also known by his nickname of "Atalaia", which is the name of the city in which he was raised. He set the fastest time for the Porto Alegre marathon when he won the race in 1994. He was a bronze medalist in the marathon at the 1995 Pan American Games in Mar del Plata, behind Benjamín Paredes and Mark Coogan respectively. His personal best time of 2:11:01 came at the 1997 Berlin Marathon, where he placed 13th.

References

External links

1969 births
Living people
Brazilian male marathon runners
Sportspeople from Paraná (state)
Pan American Games bronze medalists for Brazil
Pan American Games medalists in athletics (track and field)
Athletes (track and field) at the 1995 Pan American Games
Medalists at the 1995 Pan American Games
20th-century Brazilian people
21st-century Brazilian people